Şakir Bilgin (born 1951 in Bolu) is a German-Turkish writer.

He studied in Istanbul and he worked as a physical education teacher in Turkey and Cologne.

He was arrested in 1982 during his vacation in Turkey because he was related to Devrimci Sol.

Works
 Güneş Her Gün Doğar, 1988
 Devrimden Konuşuyorduk, 1990, Istanbul
 Lasst die Berge unsere Geschichte erzählen. Dipa Verlag, Frankfurt 1991
 Bırak Öykümüzü Dağlar Anlatsın,1992
 Sürgündeki Yabancı, 1998, Istanbul
 Bir Daha Susma Yüreğim, 2001, Köln
 Güzellikler Yeter Bana, 2003, Köln
 Ich heiße Meryem, nicht Miriam. Internationales Kulturwerk-Hildesheim, 2005

References

External links 

www.evrensel.net

1951 births
People from Bolu
Living people
Turkish writers
Turkish emigrants to Germany
German male writers